The mayor of Carrboro is the presiding member of the governing body of Carrboro, North Carolina, United States. The office has been occupied since the town's incorporation as the Town of Venable in 1911. The town council is composed of the mayor, who serves a term of two years, and six council members serving staggered terms of four years.

List

William H. Parker (1911–1917; 1937–1941)
Thomas "Newt" Mann (1917–1918; 1923–1927)
Braxton Bynum Lloyd (1918–1919)
Hyde Bryan Durham (1919–1923; 1927–1933)
Seaton E. Lloyd (1923)
Clifton C. Head (1933–1935)
Roy Rigsbee (1935–1937)
Robert B. Studebaker (1941–1943)
Isaac A. West (1943–1949)
Isaac F. "Dawson" Hardee (1949–1951)
J. Sullivan "Hoot" Gibson (1951–1955)
Robert B. Todd (1955–1960)
Charles Taylor Ellington (1960–1966)
H. Bryant Hackney (1966–1967)
T. Hughes Lloyd (1967–1971)
Robert J. Wells (1971–1975)
Ruth West (1975–1977)
Robert W. Drakeford (1977–1983)
James V. Porto, Jr (1983–1987)
Eleanor Kinnaird (1987–1995)
Michael R. Nelson (1995–2005)
Mark Chilton (2005–2013)
Lydia Lavelle (2013–2021)
Damon Seils (2021–)

References 

Carrboro, North Carolina
Mayors